"Switchback" is a song by the American electronic rock project Celldweller, released in 2003 on the self-titled debut album. Like other Celldweller tracks, "Switchback" has been licensed for media usage.

Overview

Background
Klayton has described Switchback as the "most expensive song I've ever shelved", having recorded more than 50 demos for three years. $11,500 was spent on recording and mixing an early version (dubbed the "Detroit 2000" mix on The Beta Cessions release) which eventually got scrapped. Switchback was the last track to be recorded and mixed for the album.

Music Video
The music video was produced, edited and directed by Klayton himself and was shot on location at The High Street House. Klayton had described the "Gray Girl" as his "mirror image", stating, "she was like an alter ego or a version of me in a perverted form". A majority of the footage that was shot did not "translate" into the vision Klayton had and as a result, the original storyline for the video was scrapped and became something that Klayton "did not want", having described the video as, "a bunch of guys in a room lip syncing to the music".

Track listing
UK promo single

Switchback/Own Little World Remix EP

Media usage 
"Switchback" is the most used Celldweller track to be used for various media, including:
 Halloween: Resurrection
 Spider-Man 2
 Doom
 Catwoman
 The Punisher
 Paycheck
 CSI
 xXx: State of the Union
 National Security
 Bad Boys 2
 Out for a Kill
 Bring It On Again
 Kart Racer
 Project Gotham Racing 3
 Enter The Matrix
 One Tree Hill
 America's Next Top Model
 Punk'd
 Dawson's Creek
 Roswell
 Access Hollywood
 Dead Rising 2, used in the boss battle against psychopath characters Reed and Roger.
 Pump It Up Pro 2
 Death Race 2
 Jaegarn 5 - Enemy of the State
 KickBeat
 World Extreme Cagefighting

External links 
 Music video for "Switchback"

References 

2003 singles
Celldweller songs
2003 songs